Léon Roth (born 10 September 1926) is a Luxembourgian sprint canoer who competed in the early 1950s. He was born in Diekirch. At the 1952 Summer Olympics in Helsinki, he finished 17th in the K-1 10000 m event. He was eliminated in the heats of the K-2 1000 m event. In 2008 he was promoted to the rank of Chevalier in the Order of Merit of the Grand Duchy of Luxembourg.

References

1926 births
Living people
Canoeists at the 1952 Summer Olympics
People from Diekirch 
Luxembourgian male canoeists
Olympic canoeists of Luxembourg
Knights of the Order of Merit of the Grand Duchy of Luxembourg